Zhubei (Wade-Giles: Chupei; Hakka PFS: Chuk-pet; Hokkien POJ: Tek-pak) is a city in Hsinchu County of the streamlined Taiwan Province, Republic of China. It is one of the fastest-growing settlements in Taiwan, with a population gain of 51,000 between 2010 and 2019, the highest of any township/city or district. The city has attracted migration both because of its proximity to Hsinchu City and the Hsinchu Science and Technology Park, and because the Hsinchu County government has focused most of its infrastructure here.

It is governed as a county-administered city, and is the county seat of Hsinchu County. Taiwan High Speed Rail's Hsinchu HSR station is located here.

History

Empire of Japan

In 1941,  and  merged to become  under Shinchiku District, Shinchiku Prefecture.

Republic of China
Zhubei was originally a rural township under Hsinchu County from 1950 to 1988. In October 1988, Zhubei Township was promoted to a county-administered city.

Geography
Zhubei borders Hsinchu City to the southwest, Xinfeng and Hukou Townships to the north, Qionglin and Xinpu to the East, Zhudong to the southeast, and the Taiwan Strait to its west. It is the discharge point of the Fongshan River and the Touqian River into the Taiwan Strait. Zhubei has been a satellite city of Hsinchu City since Hsinchu City reformed to become a special municipality in 1982. Due to the separation of Hsinchu City from Hsinchu County and Zhubei becoming the Hsinchu County seat, as well as its proximity to the Hsinchu Science and Technology Park and the semiconductor industry, the city has acquired an increasingly large amount of capital inflow from government, as well as a rapid population increase and a resulting spike in real estate values. The city's population was estimated at 211,746 in February 2023.

Administrative divisions
The city is administered as 30 villages: Aikou, Baide, Beilun, Beixing, Chongyi, Damei, Dayi, Doulun, Fude, Lianxing, Luchang, Mayuan, Shangyi, Shixing, Taihe, Tunghai, Tungping, Tungxing, Wenhua, Xingan, Xingang, Xinguo, Xinlun, Xinshe, Xinzhuang, Xizhou, Zhongxing, Zhubei, Zhuren and Zhuyi.

Government institutions
 Hsinchu County Government
 Hsinchu County Council

Economy

The agricultural aspect of Zhubei has shifted from mainly rice paddy farming to more floral and fruit cultivation that attracts tourists; however the majority of the local economy is now fueled by the semiconductor industry, real estate speculation and the service sector. Parts of Zhubei City have retained their traditional infrastructure following the demolition of the old city. There are also industrial parks in the city, which are the Hsinchu Biomedical Science Park and the Tai Yuen Hi-Tech Industrial Park.

Tourist attractions
 Cai-Tian-Fu-Di Nation
 Chinese Sweet Gum Avenue
 Coast Proterozoic Forest
 Feng-Qi Sunset Glow
 Hsinchu County Stadium
 New Moon Beach
 Red Forest Park
 Wen-Lin Hall

Education
 University
 National Taiwan University of Zhubei (focuses mainly on institutional research).
 National Yang Ming Chiao Tung University of Zhubei
 National Taiwan University of Science and Technology of Zhubei (under construction).
 High School
 National Zhu-Bei Senior High School
 Yi Ming Senior High School

Transportation

Rail

Taiwan Railways Administration

Zhubei railway station is the main railway station in Zhubei City. In addition, there is also a Liujia railway station, which is transferrable to Hsinchu HSR station.

Taiwan High Speed Rail
Hsinchu HSR station is located in Zhubei, which is transferrable to Liujia railway station.

Highway
Zhubei is served by National Highway No. 1.

References

External links 

  

County-administered cities of Taiwan
Populated places in Hsinchu County